Sergei Anokhin may refer to:

 Sergei Anokhin (footballer) (born 1981), Russian footballer
 Sergei Anokhin (test pilot) (1910–1986), Soviet test pilot and potential cosmonaut